Santa Ana de Huachi Airport  is an airstrip serving the river port village of Santa Ana de Mosetenes (de), in the La Paz Department of Bolivia. The village was formerly named Santa Ana de Huachi.

There is moderately rising terrain nearby to the north and west.

See also

Transport in Bolivia
List of airports in Bolivia

References

External links 
OpenStreetMap - Santa Ana
OurAirports - Santa Ana
Fallingrain - Santa Ana Airport

Airports in La Paz Department (Bolivia)